Tritonia pallescens is a species of dendronotid nudibranch. It is a marine gastropod mollusc in the family Tritoniidae.

Distribution
This species was discovered in the Cape Verde islands.

References

Tritoniidae
Gastropods described in 1906